Carl Sheldon "Cap" Williams (May 16, 1872 – November 8, 1960) was an American football player, coach, and ophthalmologist.   He played college football at Oberlin College and the University of Pennsylvania during the 1890s.  He returned to Penn and served as the head football coach there from 1902 to 1907, compiling a record of 60–10–4.  His Penn Quakers teams of 1904 and 1907 have been recognized as national champions.  Williams later practiced ophthalmology for many years in Philadelphia.

Early life and education
William was born on May 16, 1872 in Chatham, Ohio.  A Wellington, Ohio native, he graduated from the University of Pennsylvania in 1894 with a bachelor of science and a medical degree in 1897.

Playing career

Oberlin
Williams played at Oberlin College in 1891 and 1892.  The 1891 Yeomen played without a paid coach and went 2–2.  The next year Williams was named captain. This team was coached by John Heisman.  The Yeomen finished the season undefeated including a season opening victory over Ohio State.  Williams scored the first touchdown early in the game which would become a 40–0 route of the Buckeyes.  During that season the Yeomen also claimed a second victory over the Buckeyes and a victory over the Michigan but both schools dispute this.

Penn
On Heisman's advice, Williams transferred to his coach's former school, the University of Pennsylvania.  He lettered three seasons at quarterback for the Red and Blue under renowned coach George Washington Woodruff. At the time Williams played quarterback under Woodruff, the forward pass was illegal.   To advance the ball down the field, Woodruff coached his quarterback to "pass the ball with his foot."  The rules at the time were that anybody that kicked the ball or anybody behind the kicker was allowed to recover the ball and retain possession.  Williams was able to place his kicks with great accuracy allow Penn to recover for a first down.

1893 season
In his first year as quarterback, he helped the 1893 Quakers to a 12–3 record.  The team started strong by winning the first 11 game.  In those 11 games the defense only gave up 18 points while the offence scored 305 points.  The season collapsed in last four games when Penn lost three out of the last four games to Harvard, Yale and Princeton. At the time Penn rarely beat these three schools.   All of the games were close and in losing the game 14–6 to Yale, Penn was able to score a moral victory by scoring.  Yale had been un-scored on for 35 straight games stretching from 1890, successively scoring 1,355 unanswered points.

1894 season
In 1894 Williams helped Penn to its first undefeated season.  The 1894 team was retroactively named national champions by Parke H. Davis though Yale and Princeton were also retroactively named national champions by other organizations.   The highlight of the season was a 12–0 victory over Princeton (only the second in 30 meetings) and an 18–4 victory over Harvard. The 1894 squad featured a talented backfield that consisted of Williams, Alden Knipe (halfback), George H. Brooke (fullback) and Winchester Osgood (halfback).

1895 season
Williams was elected captain of the Penn's 1895 team and was named an All American that year.  As captain, he led Penn to another undefeated (14-0) seasons and a second-consecutive retroactive national title.

Helping Heisman
Other than the two undefeated seasons, Williams may is best known for being instrumental in getting John Heisman back into coaching.   Before the 1895 season, Walter Riggs a graduate manager for the Auburn Tigers football team, wrote to Williams asking the Penn captain to suggest a suitable coach. He recommended his former coach at Oberlin, who at the time was a tomato farmer in Texas. Auburn hired Heisman, who went on to Hall of Fame career.

Athletic clubs
Williams continued playing football after college, as quarterback for the Orange Athletic Club in 1897 and the Duquesne Country and Athletic Club in 1898 and 1899.

Coaching career

In 1902 Williams succeeded his former coach, George W. Woodruff, at the University of Pennsylvania. When Williams first arrived he had to deal with a team and athletic department recovering from an undergraduate and dental student revolt that led to Woodruff to resign. The students were dissatisfied with the team's performance in the 1901 season and demanded more undergraduate say in athletic department and coaching.  At the time the Athletic Association's Board of Directors was controlled by graduate and professional students. To protest Woodruff resignation all of Penn's graduate coaches resigned. Williams introduced a coaching system in which he served as head coach while being aided by a group of other alumni who served as assistant coaches. This system reduced the damage any one coach or assistant coach had to leave the team. He quickly rebuilt the Quakers and led them to two retroactive national titles in 1904 and 1907.  In just his third season as head coach, Williams and Penn posted a 12–0 record and the program's fourth national crown. This Quakers squad has a dominating Defense that only allowed 0.3 points a game with Swarthmore the only school to score on them that season.  The next year Williams led Penn to the second-straight undefeated season posting a 12–0–1 mark. Once again defense dominated with seven shutouts.  Penn’s fifth and Williams second (as a coach) retroactive national title came after an 11–1 campaign in his last year at the helm of the Quakers.  He was replaced the season by Sol Metzger for the 1908 season. He finished his coaching career 60–10–4 record.

Medical career and death
Williams earned degrees in ophthalmology the University of Heidelberg and London's Royal Ophthalmic College.  He practiced ophthalmology for many years in Philadelphia, serving on the staff at Chesnut Hill Hospital, the Hospital of the University of Pennsylvania, and Georgetown Hospital.  During World War I, Williams served as a captain in the Air Medical Corps, and later rose to the rank of major in the Army Medical Reserve Corps.  He died on November 8, 1960 at the age of 88 near Pennsburg, Pennsylvania.

Head coaching record

Note: Before 1936, national champions were determined by historical research and retroactive ratings and polls.  1907 poll results = Penn: Billingsley and Yale: Helms, National Championship Foundation, Parke H. Davis1904 poll results = Penn: Helms, National Championship Foundation, Parke H. Davis and Michigan: Billingsley, National Championship Foundation

References

1872 births
1960 deaths
19th-century players of American football
American football quarterbacks
American ophthalmologists
Oberlin Yeomen football players
Penn Quakers football coaches
Penn Quakers football players
Duquesne Country and Athletic Club players
Heidelberg University alumni
American military personnel of World War I
United States Army officers
People from Wellington, Ohio
People from Medina County, Ohio
Players of American football from Ohio
Physicians from Pennsylvania